Saint-Marcel-lès-Valence (literally Saint-Marcel near Valence) is a commune in the Drôme department in southeastern France.

Population

Geography 
The commune of Saint-Marcel-lès-Valence borders the city of Valence, the prefecture of Drôme.

See also
Communes of the Drôme department

References

Communes of Drôme